The 1983 Richmond Spiders football team was an American football team that represented the University of Richmond as an independent during the 1983 NCAA Division I-AA football season. In their fourth season under head coach Dal Shealy, Richmond compiled a 3–8 record.

Schedule

References

Richmond
Richmond Spiders football seasons
Richmond Spiders